Lynn Haven is a city in Bay County, Florida, United States, north of Panama City. The population was 18,493 at the 2010 census. Like many communities in Bay County, the city was severely damaged by Category 5 Hurricane Michael on October 10, 2018.

History
Lynn Haven was founded in 1911 by Union veterans from the American Civil War. The town was named after W. H. Lynn, a primary stockholder of the St. Andrews Bay Development Company, the corporation that owned and developed the land on which Lynn Haven grew.

On October 10, 2018, Hurricane Michael made landfall near Lynn Haven. The 3rd strongest hurricane to ever make landfall in the contiguous United States was the first category 5 hurricane to strike the United States since Hurricane Andrew in 1992. Hurricane Michael displaced thousands of Lynn Haven residents.

Geography

The city is located north of Panama City along Florida State Road 77, which is the main route through the city. FL-77 leads north 41 mi (66 km) to Chipley along Interstate 10 and south 6 mi (10 km) to the center of Panama City.

Demographics

As of the 2020 United States census, there were 18,695 people and 7,605 households residing in the city. 

The racial makeup of the city was 81.9% white, 9.0% black or African American, 0.1% American Indian or Alaska Native, 1.8% Asian, 6.0& two or more races, and 5.9% Hispanic or Latino.

There were 2,136 veterans living in the city. 3.4% of the population were foreign born persons. 

The median gross rent was $1,274 and the median value of owner-occupied housing units was $214,800. 

97.1% of households had a computer and 93.5% had a broadband internet subscription. 94.8% of those 25 years and older had a graduated high school or higher and 28.7% of that same population had a Bachelor's degree or higher. 

The median household income was $68,406 and the income per capita was $28,826. 10.5% of the population lived below the poverty threshold.

Education

There are six public schools:

 Lynn Haven Elementary School
 Mowat Middle School
 A. Crawford Mosley High School
 Deer Point Elementary School
 New Horizon School
 Haney Vo Tech School

There are two charter schools:
 Bay Haven 
 North Bay Haven

Historic areas

Historic areas and buildings in Lynn Haven include:
 First Presbyterian Church, built in 1911
 City Hall, built in 1928
 Monument Park
 Bailey Bridge, built in 1946 to replace the wooden pier that spanned North Bay from Lynn Haven to Southport
 Panama Country Club Golf Course, developed in 1927

Library

Lynn Haven Public Library, Bay County’s first library, was established in the city of Lynn Haven in 1911 when a group of fourteen ladies donated a book and three magazines. Without a true library, they met in various homes and other local buildings as the Lynn Haven Literary Club. By 1915, the collection grew to 500 volumes. In 1922, the McMullin family donated a building and $1,000 and library became known as the McMullin Library. The Literary Club began a weekly story-telling hour on Saturdays for children under the age of twelve. 

In 1925, the Literary Club joined the Federation of Women’s Club, continuing their sponsorship of the McMullin Library. The Lynn Haven Women’s Club provided building maintenance and expense, made several improvements, and purchased many books. 

In 1961, the McMullin Library joined the Northwest Regional Library System. During this time, the city was flourishing and required a larger, more modern building. The library moved to a new location, once again. In 1970, the new North Bay Branch Library was founded. In the middle of the 1980s, the library underwent a major expansion to improve service and create room for over 11,000 volumes . A fund drive was held, along with funds matched by a grant from the State of Florida allowed for the building addition. The grand opening happened at the end of 1988.

In 1990, the City of Lynn Haven took charge of the library’s financial responsibilities and the name was changed to the Lynn Haven Public Library.

References

External links

 City of Lynn Haven official website
 Lynn Haven Public Library

Cities in Bay County, Florida
Populated places on the Intracoastal Waterway in Florida
Populated places established in 1914
Cities in Florida
1914 establishments in Florida